Lawes railway station is a closed railway station on the Main Line railway in Queensland, Australia. It served the locality of Lawes in the Lockyer Valley Region.

Description 
The station building has been demolished, though the dirt carpark and an abandoned section of concrete path remains visible, beside an electrical works box.

References

Disused railway stations in Queensland
Main Line railway, Queensland
Lockyer Valley Region